Vitovlje  is a village in central Bosnia, in the Travnik Municipality, Federation of Bosnia and Herzegovina. It is located on the slopes of Vlašić Mountain, under Gavrića Brdo (Gavric's Hill, 1006 m), at an altitude of about 900 m.
In medieval Bosnia, Vitovlje was in the Parish of Mel (Župa Mel).

Through the settlement flows the Dedića potok (Dedići's stream), a left tributary of the Ugar, south of Korićani's Rocks. From Vitovlje, along the Ugar, between the mountains Ranča and Ugarske stijene (Ugar's Rocks), stretches the Pougarje.

At the last census in 1991, before the collapse of Yugoslavia, Vitovlje had 708 inhabitants.
During the Bosnian War, the village was destroyed and its inhabitants were either murdered or expelled. In the post-war period, the village was restored, and most of the refugees returned to their homes. According to the census of 2013, there were 576 inhabitants.

Population (1991)

Overview

References

External links 
http://www.maplandia.com/bosnia-and-herzegovina/federacija-bosne-i-hercegovine/vitovlje/
http://www.geographic.org/geographic_names/name.php?uni=-146986&fid=622&c=bosnia_and_herzegovina

Populated places in Travnik
Villages in Bosnia and Herzegovina